Komodia may refer to:

Komödia, a 1997 album by Dreams of Sanity
Komodia (company), a technology company blamed for a security incident with Superfish software